Ophisma is a genus of moths in the family Erebidae. The genus was erected by Achille Guenée in 1852.

Species
Ophisma aeolida Druce, 1890
Ophisma albitermia Hampson, 1910
Ophisma basigutta Felder & Rogenhofer, 1874
Ophisma cuprizonea Hampson, 1913
Ophisma despagnesi Guenée, 1852
Ophisma diatonica Möschler, 1880
Ophisma exuleata Möschler, 1883
Ophisma fulvipuncta Schaus, 1911
Ophisma gravata Guenée, 1852
Ophisma ibona Plötz, 1880
Ophisma lunulifera Walker, 1865
Ophisma minna Guenée, 1852
Ophisma ningi Plötz, 1880
Ophisma nobilis Schaus, 1911
Ophisma pallescens (Walker, 1864)
Ophisma pyrosticha Druce, 1912
Ophisma sinuata Schaus, 1901
Ophisma tecta Schaus, 1894
Ophisma teterrima Hampson, 1913
Ophisma tropicalis Guenée, 1852
Ophisma turturoides Walker, 1858
Ophisma variata Schaus, 1901

References

Poaphilini
Moth genera